Widnes Central railway station served the town of Widnes, England from 1879 to 1964.

History

In 1874 the uncompleted line was sold to the Manchester, Sheffield and Lincolnshire Railway (MS&LR); and in 1875 it became the joint property of the MS&LR and the Midland Railway - two of the partners in the CLC. The third partner, the Great Northern Railway declined to take part in the project, and so it was not part of the CLC but separately administered by the Sheffield and Midland Railway Companies' Committee. This line opened for goods traffic in 1877. The Widnes line was soon extended westwards to rejoin the CLC near , forming what became known as the Widnes Loop. A passenger station on the extension, known as Widnes Central, was opened on 1 August 1879.

In 1922 16 "Down" (towards Liverpool) trains called on Mondays to Saturdays. Nine ran from Warrington Central, two from Manchester Central, one from Tanhouse Lane and two started at Widnes Central itself, all headed for Liverpool Central. "Up" services were similar. Two trains each way called on Sundays.

The station was closed by British Railways on 5 October 1964. as a result of the Beeching Axe.  Services had by then declined significantly from their peak levels in pre-grouping days (15 per day each way in 1922) to just five westbound and six eastbound departures on weekdays & Saturdays only.  The entire loop line was closed as a through route soon afterwards, though the freight yard at Tanhouse Lane remained in use for cement traffic until 2000 - access was latterly provided by a connection from the ex-LNWR Widnes Deviation Line.  The station and approach lines were demolished after closure and no trace remains.

See also
Widnes railway station
Widnes South railway station

References

Sources

Further reading

External links
Widnes Central Station on navigable 1948 O.S. map
Disused Stations - Widnes Central
Widnes Central via 8D Association

Disused railway stations in the Borough of Halton
Former Great Central and Midland Joint Railway stations
Railway stations in Great Britain opened in 1879
Railway stations in Great Britain closed in 1964
Buildings and structures in Widnes
Beeching closures in England